The 2022–23 season is the 120th season in the existence of Bradford City Association Football Club and the club's fourth consecutive season in League Two. In addition to the league, they will also compete in the 2022–23 FA Cup, the 2022–23 EFL Cup and the 2022–23 EFL Trophy.

Pre-season and friendlies
On June 8, Bradford City announced their pre-season schedule, which included a six-day training camp in Murcia. A sixth addition to the calendar was later confirmed, against Derby County.

Competitions

Overall record

League Two

League table

Results summary

Results by round

Matches

On 23 June, the league fixtures were announced.

FA Cup

Bradford were drawn at home to Harrogate Town in the first round.

EFL Cup

Bradford were drawn at home to Hull City in the first round and to Blackburn Rovers in the second round.

EFL Trophy

On 20 June, the initial Group stage draw was made, grouping Bradford City with Burton Albion and Sheffield Wednesday.

Squad statistics

As of 18 March 2023.

Transfers

In

Out

Loans in

Loans out

References

Bradford City
Bradford City A.F.C. seasons